The region of the East of England is divided into 58 parliamentary constituencies which is made up of 16 borough constituencies and 42 county constituencies. Since the general election of December 2019, 52 are represented by Conservative MPs, five by Labour MPs, and one by a Liberal Democrat MP.

Constituencies

Proposed boundary changes 
See 2023 Periodic Review of Westminster constituencies for further details.

Following the abandonment of the Sixth Periodic Review (the 2018 review), the Boundary Commission for England formally launched the 2023 Review on 5 January 2021. The Commission calculated that the number of seats to be allocated to the Eastern region will increase by 3, from 58 to 61. Initial proposals were published on 8 June 2021 and, following two periods of public consultation, revised proposals were published on 8 November 2022. Final proposals will be published by 1 July 2023.

Under the revised proposals, the following constituencies for the region would come into effect at the next general election:

Results history 
Primary data source: House of Commons research briefing - General election results from 1918 to 2019

2019 
The number of votes cast for each political party who fielded candidates in constituencies comprising the East of England region in the 2019 general election were as follows:

Percentage votes 

Key:

CON - Conservative Party, including National Liberal Party up to 1966

LAB - Labour Party

LIB - Liberal Party up to 1979; SDP-Liberal Alliance 1983 & 1987; Liberal Democrats from 1992

UKIP/Br - UK Independence Party 2010 to 2017 (included in Other up to 2005 and in 2019); Brexit Party in 2019

Green - Green Party of England and Wales (included in Other up to 2005)

Seats 

Key: CON - Conservative Party, including National Liberal Party up to 1966

LAB - Labour Party

LIB - Liberal Party up to 1979; SDP-Liberal Alliance 1983 & 1987; Liberal Democrats from 1992

OTH - 1945 - Common Wealth Party (unopposed by Labour); 2015 - UK Independence Party

See also
 List of United Kingdom Parliament constituencies
 List of parliamentary constituencies in Bedfordshire
 List of parliamentary constituencies in Cambridgeshire
 List of parliamentary constituencies in Essex
 List of parliamentary constituencies in Hertfordshire
 List of parliamentary constituencies in Norfolk
 List of parliamentary constituencies in Suffolk

Notes

References